Thomas Dickson Armour (24 September 1896 – 11 September 1968) was a Scottish-American professional golfer. He was nicknamed The Silver Scot. He was the winner of three of golf's major championships: 1927 U.S. Open, 1930 PGA, and 1931 Open Championship. 
Armour popularized the term yips, the colloquial term for a sudden and unexplained loss of skills in experienced athletes.

Early life
Armour was born on 24 September 1896 in Edinburgh, Scotland, the son of Martha Dickson and her husband George Armour, a baker. He went to school at Boroughmuir High School, Edinburgh, (formerly Boroughmuir Senior Secondary School) and studied at the University of Edinburgh. At the outbreak of World War I enlisted with the Black Watch and was a machine-gunner. He rose from private to Staff Major in the Tank Corps. His conduct earned him an audience with George V. However, he lost his sight to a mustard gas explosion and surgeons had to add a metal plate to his head and left arm. During his convalescence, he regained the sight of his right eye, and began playing much more golf.

Golf career
Armour won the French Amateur tournament in 1920. He moved to the United States and met Walter Hagen who gave him a job as secretary of the Westchester-Biltmore Club. He competed in important amateur tournaments in the U.S. before turning professional in 1924.

Armour won the 1927 U.S. Open, 1930 PGA Championship, and the 1931 Open Championship.  With Jim Barnes and Rory McIlroy, he is one of three natives of The United Kingdom to win three different professional majors. His 1930 campaign was overshadowed by Bobby Jones' Grand Slam, and Armour seems to have been overlooked.

Armour also won the Canadian Open three times, a feat exceeded only by Leo Diegel, who won four.

At the Shawnee Open in 1927, Armour scored the first ever "archaeopteryx" (15 or more over par) when he made a 23 on a par 5, for 18 over par. It still stands as the highest score on a hole in PGA history. This historic performance happened just one week after he'd won the U.S. Open.

Retirement and later life
Armour retired from full-time professional golf after the 1935 season, although he competed periodically in top-class events for several years afterwards. He taught at the Boca Raton Club in Florida from 1926 to 1955, for $50 a lesson. His pupils included Babe Didrikson Zaharias and Lawson Little. He was also a member at the Winged Foot Golf Club in suburban New York City, where he spent much of his summers.

After becoming an American citizen in November 1942, Armour played in exhibitions for USO and Red Cross during World War II.

Armour co-wrote a book How to Play Your Best Golf All the Time (1953) with Herb Graffis. It became a best-seller and for many years was the biggest-selling book ever authored on golf. A series of 8mm films based on the book was released by Castle Films including Short Game Parts I and II, Long Hitting Clubs, Grip, and Stance.

Armour is succeeded by his grandson, Tommy Armour III, who is a two-time winner on the PGA Tour.

Death and legacy
Armour died in Larchmont, New York and was cremated at the Ferncliff Cemetery in Hartsdale, New York but not interred there. Some modern golf equipment is still marketed in his name. Armour was inducted into the World Golf Hall of Fame in 1976.

Amateur wins
1920 French Amateur

Professional wins

PGA Tour wins (25)
1920 (1) Pinehurst Fall Pro-Am Bestball (as an amateur, with Leo Diegel)
1925 (1) Florida West Coast Open
1926 (1) Winter Pro Golf Championship
1927 (5) Long Beach Open, El Paso Open, U.S. Open, Canadian Open, Oregon Open
1928 (4) Metropolitan Open, Philadelphia Open Championship, Pennsylvania Open Championship, Sacramento Open
1929 (1) Western Open
1930 (3) Canadian Open, PGA Championship, St. Louis Open
1931 (1) The Open Championship
1932 (3) Miami Open, Miami International Four-Ball (with Ed Dudley), Mid-South Bestball (with Al Watrous)
1934 (2) Canadian Open, Pinehurst Fall Pro-Pro (with Bobby Cruickshank)
1935 (1) Miami Open
1936 (1) Walter Olson Golf Tournament (tie with Willie Macfarlane)
1938 (1) Mid-South Open

Major championships are shown in bold.

Other wins
1927 Miami International Four-Ball (with Bobby Cruickshank)
1938 Mid South Pro/Pro (with Bobby Cruickshank; tie with Henry Picard and Jack Grout)

Major championships

Wins (3)

1 Defeated Harry Cooper in an 18-hole playoff: Armour 76 (+4), Cooper 79 (+7).
Note: The PGA Championship was match play until 1958

Results timeline

NYF = tournament not yet founded
NT = no tournament
WD = withdrew
CUT = missed the half-way cut
R64, R32, R16, QF, SF = round in which player lost in match play
"T" indicates a tie for a place

Sources: U.S. Open and U.S. Amateur, Amateur Championship:1920, 1921

Team appearances
Amateur
Great Britain vs USA (representing Great Britain): 1921

Professional
Great Britain vs USA (representing the United States): 1926

See also
List of golfers with most PGA Tour wins

Notes

External links
 

Biography of Tommy Armour
Tommy Armour – The Greatest (Dr Milton Wayne)

Alumni of the University of Edinburgh
American male golfers
Black Watch soldiers
British Army personnel of World War I
Burials at Ferncliff Cemetery
Golf writers and broadcasters
Golfers from Edinburgh
Golfers from New York (state)
Military personnel from Edinburgh
People educated at Boroughmuir High School
People educated at Fettes College
People from Larchmont, New York
People with acquired American citizenship
PGA Tour golfers
Royal Tank Regiment officers
Scottish emigrants to the United States
Scottish male golfers
Sportswriters from New York (state)
Winners of men's major golf championships
World Golf Hall of Fame inductees
1896 births
1968 deaths